Bishop Smith Catholic High School is the largest school within the Renfrew County Catholic District School Board. It is located in Pembroke, Ontario.

External links 
 Bishop Smith Catholic High School

High schools in Renfrew County
Pembroke, Ontario
Catholic secondary schools in Ontario
Educational institutions in Canada with year of establishment missing